Monticelli Pavese (Lombard: Muntsé) is a comune (municipality) in the Province of Pavia in the Italian region Lombardy, located about 50 km southeast of Milan and about 30 km east of Pavia. As of 31 December 2004, it had a population of 737 and an area of 20.2 km².

Monticelli Pavese borders the following municipalities: Badia Pavese, Calendasco, Chignolo Po, Orio Litta, Pieve Porto Morone, Rottofreno, Sarmato.

Demographic evolution

References

Cities and towns in Lombardy